Malbone is a surname. Notable people with the surname include:

Francis Malbone (1759–1809), American merchant and politician
Edward Greene Malbone (1777–1807), American portrait miniaturist